Astro Radio Sdn Bhd (formerly known as Airtime Management and Programming Sdn Bhd or AMP Radio Networks) is a Malaysian radio network company which operates radio broadcasting services and more since 1996. It is a wholly owned subsidiary of Astro Malaysia Holdings Berhad. Astro Radio owns and manages 10 private radio stations which are transmitted through the FM (frequency modulation) radio spectrum. As of November 2021, Astro Radio still remains as the number one and largest radio network company in Malaysia with 77.7% of Peninsular Malaysians and 15.6 million listeners tuning in to its stations weekly, together with its Media Prima counterpart, Media Prima Audio, according to the GfK Radio Audience Measurement (RAM) Wave 1 in October 2021. ERA being at top of the list with the most audience reach estimated at 6,000,000 listeners, followed by SINAR and GEGAR.

Company background 
Astro Radio was officially launched on 1 June 1996 as Airtime Management & Programming Radio Network with the very first time five opened audio only including Hitz FM, Mix FM, Light & Easy, Classic Rock and TalkRadio.

Airtime Management & Programming Radio Network Sdn Bhd (AMP Radio Networks) operates eight terrestrial FM networks: Era FM, MY FM, Hitz FM, Mix FM, LiteFM, Sinar FM, Melody FM & THR (Raaga and Gegar). AMP broadcasts in four languages with 11.5 million Malaysians tuning in weekly.

AMP is the sole provider of 19 satellite radio services (which include the nine FM services and are available to all ASTRO subscribers in Malaysia and Brunei), the first South-East Asian broadcaster to utilise LIU (local insertion units) for local or regional advertisers and utilises Dynamic RDS (Radio Data System) as a commercial tool. Internationally, AMP also had involvement in the growth of radio industries in India, Indonesia and China.

AMP develops complementary platforms including on-air, on-ground, on-line and mobile technologies.

In 2012, as part of the expansion of its operations, AMP Radio Networks became Astro Radio Sdn Bhd.

In October 2017, Astro Radio announced the launch of two new radio brands - goXuan and Zayan for a new generation of smart, technology and socially connected along with the new generation of listeners who are trendsetters and influencers in the digital and social media space. Zayan is the first Malaysian radio brand for modern Muslims, it aspires to serve this growing community by delivering music, content and dialogue that reverberates among them. While goXUAN goes where the trendsetting Chinese Gen Z are making their mark. Astro Radio has built a state of art live broadcast studio from which the brand will stream live entertainment content via its digital platforms throughout the whole day. Unlike any other radio brand in Malaysia, goXUAN is visually-led.

On 1 January 2018, Astro Radio dropped the suffix “FM” as part of the rebranding for all its 11 radio stations, to focus on digital platform, inline with the current technology development.

Other brands

Raku 
Astro Radio launched a radio and music streaming service platform known as Raku in April 2015 through mobile and web. Raku is a short-form for Radio Aku (‘My Radio’ in Bahasa Malaysia). Through Raku, Malaysians can stream millions of songs, videos and playlists curated by top local artistes including Yuna, Paper Plane Pursuit, Dasha Logan and many more. Users can also listen to more than 20 live radio stations through the free and premium versions of Raku. The application also provides local community updates such as articles, news, traffic and sports. Raku is available in English, Bahasa Malaysia, Mandarin and Tamil. However, Raku services were rebranded into the new SYOK platform in 2019.

SYOK 
Astro Radio launched a multilingual entertainment and lifestyle platform known as SYOK in July 2019. The platform can allow users to listen to 26 Astro Radio brands (including online-only stations or Direct-To-Home [DTH] stations that are available on Astro TV, and East Malaysian stations) via live online streaming, listen to podcasts of all live radio and exclusive content, watch original short-form videos, read current articles, news and traffic updates and participate in contests.

 ERA (including both Sabah and Sarawak stations)
 SINAR
 GEGAR
 ZAYAN
 MY (including both Sabah and Sarawak stations)
 MELODY
 GOXUAN
 HITZ (including both Sabah and Sarawak stations)
 MIX
 LITE
 RAAGA
 Syok Original Radio
 SYOK Bayu
 SYOK Gold
 SYOK India Beat
 SYOK Jazz
 SYOK Kenyalang
 SYOK Opus
 SYOK Osai
 SYOK Classic Rock
 News, Sports & Talk (Online only)
 Astro Awani
 优内容 (YOU Streaming)

SYOK also offered pop-up stations, featuring tracks for some occasions, such as Public holidays in Malaysia. In addiction, they also provide Featured Radio, which include partnered radio stations such as Red Radio (in partnership with AirAsia), Rakita and AFO RADIO.

Stations

Defunct radio stations
AMP changed its line-up, swapping two of its English FM brands, namely Classic Rock and TalkRadio, for ERA FM (Bahasa Malaysia) and MY FM (Chinese), respectively. Melody FM was launched on 15 August 2012 to replace XFM on FM and Astro.

References

External links
 Corporate information from Astro Radio website
 
 SYOK (lifestyle platform) website
 ERA website
 GEGAR website
 GOXUAN website
 HITZ website
 LITE website
 MELODY website
 MY website
 RAAGA website
 SINAR website
 ZAYAN website

1996 establishments in Malaysia
Astro Malaysia Holdings
Privately held companies of Malaysia
Malaysian companies established in 1996